Canterbury High School is an Ottawa-Carleton District School Board high school in the Urbandale neighbourhood of Ottawa, Ontario, Canada.
It is an arts magnet school which draws in students from the Ottawa area to their specialized arts program. It is located at 900 Canterbury Ave, and serves over 1300 students.

While offering both an arts program and a general program, Canterbury is known primarily for the arts in both its local community and nationally.

History

The school opened in 1969 as a comprehensive high school. It was the last in a series of ten high schools built by the Collegiate Board to deal with baby boomers. At the time of its opening, it was considered an extremely modern school, employing all the latest ideas in education. Most notably, many of its walls were movable (no longer a feature), allowing for an easy reorganization of space. It also had one of the largest libraries of any secondary school and today it is host to one of the largest secondary school auditoriums. From 1969 to 1976, Canterbury offered a technical program based on Aerospace Engineering. The shops offered Air-frame, and other aviation-based technical studies. Additionally, the school operated a 1969 Cessna 190J (CF-CHS) and a Schweitzer 2-33 glider( CF-ABE), providing unique opportunities to students. However, The Ottawa Board of Education eventually withdrew support of the concept due to liability issues.

The Arts Canterbury program began in 1983, making Canterbury High School an arts magnet school for the Ottawa-Gatineau region.

Canterbury Arts
Canterbury has five different arts programs that students must audition and interview for to be accepted into:
Dance
Dramatic Arts
Literary Arts
Music
Winds and Percussion
Strings
Vocal
Visual Arts

Notable alumni

 Ashton Baumann, swimmer 
 Mark Bell, hockey
 Raoul Bhaneja, actor/musician
 Brian Campbell, hockey
 Alexander Carson (filmmaker), filmmaker
 Penelope Corrin, actress/comedian
 Shean Donovan, hockey
 Matthew Edison, actor/playwright
 Jenny Galt, musician
 Martin Gero, writer/producer
 Stephen Gray, rugby player
Chester Hansen, bassist of BadBadNotGood
 Jessica Holmes, actress/comedian
 Jonathan Hobin, photo-based artist
 Simon Huck, PR executive/reality star
 Peter Hume, politician
 Alyn McCauley, hockey
 Moira J. Moore, author
 Stephanie Moore, actress/writer
 Hannah Moscovitch, playwright
 Ty Olsson, actor
 Richard Parry, musician/Arcade Fire
 Michael Peca, hockey
 Emma Portner, dancer/choreographer
 Gary Roberts, hockey
 Jeremy Roberts, politician
 Vik Sahay, actor
 Jordan Tannahill, playwright
 Emma Taylor-Isherwood, actress
 Sally Taylor-Isherwood, actress

Sports
The school maintains an athletics program which includes wrestling, rowing, swimming, volleyball, baseball, basketball, soccer, football, water polo, curling, ultimate frisbee, ice hockey, rugby and track and field. It has one of the broadest ranges of sports teams in the Ottawa-Carleton District School Board.

See also
List of high schools in Ontario

References

Keith, Janet. The Collegiate Institute Board of Ottawa: A Short History, 1843-1969. Ottawa: Kent, 1969.
2007-08 OCDSB School Profile
2006-07 OCDSB School Profile
2005-06 OCDSB School Profile
2004-05 OCDSB School Profile

External links
 
Canterbury Arts Centre Development Association
Canterbury Collection
Canterbury School Council
OCDSB Website

High schools in Ottawa
Educational institutions established in 1969
Art schools in Canada
1969 establishments in Ontario